Microsyagrus rosae is a species of leaf beetle of Uganda and the Democratic Republic of the Congo. It was first described by Gilbert Ernest Bryant in 1936.

References 

Eumolpinae
Beetles of the Democratic Republic of the Congo
Beetles described in 1936
Insects of Uganda